Charlie's Angels: Full Throttle is a 2003 American action comedy film directed by McG and written by John August, and Cormac and Marianne Wibberley. It is the sequel to 2000's Charlie's Angels and the second installment in the Charlie's Angels film series, which is a continuation of the story that began with the television series of the same name by Ivan Goff and Ben Roberts.

In an ensemble cast, Cameron Diaz, Drew Barrymore and Lucy Liu reprise their roles as the three women working for the Townsend Agency. Crispin Glover, Matt LeBlanc and Luke Wilson also reprise their roles from the first film. It also features Justin Theroux, Demi Moore and Bernie Mac as John Bosley's adoptive brother while Robert Patrick, Shia LaBeouf, John Cleese and Ja'net DuBois appear in supporting roles. Jaclyn Smith reprised her role as Kelly Garrett from the original series for a cameo appearance. It was John Forsythe's final film role before his retirement from acting in 2006 and death in 2010 respectively.

It was released in the United States on June 27, 2003 by Sony Pictures Releasing under its Columbia Pictures label and was number one at the box office for that weekend, also making a worldwide total of $259.2million. Like its predecessor, the film received mixed reviews from critics, with praise for the performances of Diaz, Barrymore and Liu, but criticism aimed at the "bland plot and lack of sense".

Plot
After rescuing U.S. Marshal Ray Carter in Mongolia, the Angels: Natalie Cook, Dylan Sanders, and Alex Munday together with John Bosley's adoptive brother Jimmy Bosley are sent to recover titanium rings stolen from the United States Department of Justice that can display the people listed in the witness protection program. DOJ official William Rose Bailey and a protected witness, Alan Caulfield are among those killed. At Caulfield's house in San Bernardino, the Angels track his assassin Randy Emmers to a beach where they meet former Angel Madison Lee. During the Coal Bowl motorcycle race, Emmers targets another witness named Max Petroni, and the Angels try to intervene. Emmers is killed by the Thin Man (believed to be dead after the events of the first film) because he was protecting Max. Inside Emmers' pocket, the Angels discover the photos of Caulfield, Max, and, surprisingly, Dylan, under her birth name, Helen Zaas.

Dylan reveals that she is a protected witness after sending her former boyfriend, Irish mob leader Seamus O'Grady to prison. O'Grady has since targeted those who wronged him; including Dylan and Max, whose parents O'Grady killed. As Max previously testified against O'Grady, he is sent to the home of Bosley's mother for protection. At a monastery, the Angels learn about the Thin Man's past from the Mother Superior, who reveals his name, Anthony. Afterwards, the Angels track O'Grady's mob at San Pedro and manage to get the rings, but O'Grady threatens Dylan with the murder of everyone she loves. Natalie attends her boyfriend, Pete Kominsky's high school reunion at Hermosa Beach, where she overhears his friends implying he might propose, which she feels is too fast since they just moved in together. Alex returns home to her actor boyfriend, Jason while Dylan leaves the Angels and heads to Mexico. When Natalie, Bosley, and Alex notice the letter she left for them, they realize that Dylan fled to protect them. Natalie asks Charlie how O'Grady got out of jail, and Charlie reveals someone had him released on good behaviour. While hiding out in Mexico, Dylan is convinced to return after seeing an apparition of former Angel Kelly Garrett.

Natalie and Alex deduce that Carter is the one who let O'Grady out of prison after seeing him return Bosley's keys without any pain, despite claiming to have broken his ribs beforehand. Following him, the two witness him getting killed by Madison, the true mastermind. Though Dylan arrives to back the group, the Angels are shot by Madison, who takes the rings, though they survived via Kevlar vests. Back at the base, Charlie reprimands Madison for what she's done and confronts her for endangering her former teammates' lives. Madison is angry she never got the recognition she deserved from Charlie and shoots his speaker to bits. The Angels realize that Madison is going to sell the rings to the O'Grady Crime Family, the Antonioni Mafia, the Tanaka Yakuza, and the Diablo Cartel at the Hollywood Walk of Fame, where Jason's film premiere is about to commence.

The Angels arrange for the buyers to be arrested by the FBI while they confront Madison and O'Grady. The O'Grady's enter the melee, having avoided arrest when Seamus realized the Angels' plan. The Thin Man comes to the Angels' aid, helping Alex and rescuing Dylan when she is being attacked by O'Grady - he begins to fight O'Grady and kicks him off the roof. The Thin Man grabs Dylan and chokes her at first, but they ended up sharing a kiss and he pulls some of Dylan's hair out. Just as he is about to say something, O'Grady stabs him and he falls off the roof. O'Grady nearly succeeds in killing Dylan as well, but she blinds him, causing him to lose his footing and fall to his death (in the unrated cut, O'Grady is still alive and attempts to get back up but is stopped by The Thin Man, who also survived; Dylan accidentally knocks over the "E" sign and it falls on O'Grady, possibly The Thin Man as well). The Angels fight Madison all the way to an abandoned theatre, where they kick her into a chamber filled with gas and she fires her gun, inadvertently blowing herself up.

The Angels attend the premiere, where they learn that Mama Bosley is adopting Max. Peter surprises Natalie by asking her to get a puppy (the big question he was planning on asking her) and Alex terminates her "time out" with Jason. The Angels celebrate their victory together with Bosley.

Cast
 Cameron Diaz as Natalie Cook
 Drew Barrymore as Dylan Sanders / Helen Zaas
 Lucy Liu as Alex Munday
 Demi Moore as Madison Lee, a former Angel turned independent operative
 Bernie Mac as Jimmy Bosley, successor and adoptive brother of John Bosley
 Justin Theroux as Seamus O'Grady, Dylan's ex-boyfriend and head of the O'Grady Irish Mob
 Crispin Glover as the Thin Man / Anthony, a mysterious assassin
 Rodrigo Santoro as Randy Emmers, a surfer assassin hired by Madison
 Robert Patrick as Ray Carter, a corrupt Director of the U.S. Marshals Service
 John Forsythe as the voice of Charles 'Charlie' Townsend, the owner of the Townsend agency
 Matt LeBlanc as Jason Gibbons, Alex's boyfriend
 Luke Wilson as Pete Komisky, Natalie's boyfriend
 John Cleese as Mr. Munday, Alex's father
 Shia LaBeouf as Max Petroni, an orphaned teenager targeted by the mob after his testimony
 Ja'net DuBois as Momma Bosley, Jimmy's biological mother and John Bosley's adoptive mother

Cameos
 Jaclyn Smith as Kelly Garrett, one of the original Angels
 Bruce Willis as William Rose Bailey, Justice Department official murdered by Emmers
 Carrie Fisher as Mother Superior
 Robert Forster as Roger Wixon, Director of the FBI
 Pink as the Coal Bowl M.C.
 Mary-Kate and Ashley Olsen and Eve as the future Angels from Dylan's imagination 
 Ed Robertson as the sheriff
 Wayne Federman and Steve Hytner as high school reunion buddies in the bathroom
 Melissa McCarthy as a woman at crime scene. McCarthy previously appeared in the first film as a different character, Doris.
 Big Boy and Anthony Griffith as Jimmy Bosley's cousins  
 Eric Bogosian as Alan Caulfield, victim murdered by Emmers
 Chris Pontius as the Irish dock worker
 Tommy Flanagan, Chris Pontius, Jonas Barnes, and Luke Massy as Irish henchmen
 Michael Guarnera as the boss of Antonioni Mafia
 Andrew Wilson as crime scene police officer in charge
 The Pussycat Dolls as Themselves, dancing to a vamped-up "The Pink Panther Theme"

Bill Murray, who played John Bosley in the first installment, also appears in archival footage.

Production
Charlie's Angels: Animated Adventures, an animated prequel series explain how the Angels got there and their mission, concluded by the very introduction of the film.

The Seamus O'Grady prison introduction scene is a direct reference to Robert De Niro's prison-set introduction in Cape Fear. Whenever O'Grady (Justin Theroux) appears, he is accompanied by Bernard Hermann's theme from Cape Fear.

The scene where the Angels go to investigate the body of Agent Caufield dressed as crime-scene professionals is a homage/parody of CSI: Crime Scene Investigation, complete with the theme "Who Are You" by The Who.

The song "Feel Good Time" is the film's main track, and is performed by Pink.

The Thin Man character perhaps pays homage to the Thin Man in 1927 German expressionist film Metropolis, directed by Fritz Lang. In the film, Thin Man is ordered by Joh Frederson, master of Metropolis, to spy on his son Freder.

Reception

Box office
The film had a production budget of $120million. It grossed $100,830,111 at the United States box office and had to depend on earnings from the international box office to make profit. By the end of its run, the film had grossed $259,175,788 worldwide, underperforming its predecessor by $5 million.

Critical response
Charlie's Angels: Full Throttle received mixed reviews and earned a rating of 41% on Rotten Tomatoes based on 187 reviews, with an average rating of 5.10/10. The site's critical consensus reads: "Eye candy for those who don't require a movie to have a plot or for it to make sense". On Metacritic the film has weighted average score of 48 out of 100, based on reviews from 38 critics, indicating "mixed or average reviews". Audiences polled by CinemaScore gave the film an average grade of "B+" on an A+ to F scale.

Roger Ebert gave the film  stars out of 4, a higher score than the half star he gave to the first film. Ebert explained: "I realized I did not hate or despise the movie, and [...] I decided that I sort of liked it because of the high spirits of the women involved".
Amy Dawes of Variety magazine wrote: "Bigger, sleeker and better than the first, sequel Charlie's Angels: Full Throttle is a joyride of a movie that takes the winning elements of the year 2000 hit to the next level".

Accolades
The film received seven nominations at the 24th Golden Raspberry Awards including Worst Picture, Worst Actress for both Drew Barrymore and Cameron Diaz, Worst Screenplay, and Worst Excuse for an Actual Movie (All Concept/No Content), winning two trophies for Worst Remake or Sequel and Worst Supporting Actress for Demi Moore. The film also received seven nominations at the 2003 Stinkers Bad Movie Awards: Worst Director (McG), Worst Actress (Barrymore), Worst Screenplay for a Film Grossing More Than $100 Million Worldwide Using Hollywood Math, Most Intrusive Musical Score, Worst Sequel, Least "Special" Special Effects, and Worst On-Screen Group (the Angels). It won for Worst Director and Most Intrusive Musical Score.

Demi Moore was nominated for the MTV Movie Award for Best Villain, but lost against co-star Lucy Liu for her role as O-Ren Ishii in Quentin Tarantino's Kill Bill: Volume 1.

Home media
Charlie's Angels: Full Throttle was released on both VHS and DVD in widescreen and full screen formats on October 21, 2003.

Soundtrack

Charlie's Angels: Full Throttle is the soundtrack album to the 2003 film Charlie's Angels: Full Throttle. The album was released on June 24, 2003 by Columbia Records and Interscope Records.

Certifications

Other songs are not included in the soundtrack
 "Who Are You" by The Who
 "Thunder Kiss '65" by White Zombie
 "Firestarter" and "Breathe" by The Prodigy
 "Block Rockin' Beats" by The Chemical Brothers
 "Misirlou" by Dick Dale
 "Wild Thing" by Tone Lōc
 "Nuthin' but a 'G' Thang" by Dr. Dre featuring Snoop Dogg
 "Flashdance... What a Feeling" by Irene Cara
 "The Pink Panther Theme" by Henry Mancini
 "The Lonely Goatherd" by Rodgers and Hammerstein
 "Sleep Now in the Fire" by Rage Against the Machine
 "Mickey" by Toni Basil
 "Planet Claire" by The B-52s
 "Sleep Walk" by Santo & Johnny
 "Looks That Kill" by Mötley Crüe

Sequel 

Following the release of Full Throttle, the franchise was confirmed for a third and fourth film, but in 2004 the idea was cancelled. A fictional sequel titled Charlie's Angels III: The Legend of Charlie's Gold (2007) was presented within the 2001 Futurama episode "I Dated a Robot", with Lucy Liu reprising her role; the film follows the Angels dealing with an outbreak of vampires.

In 2015, Sony began the development on new Charlie's Angels installment. Elizabeth Banks directed and produced the film with her husband Max Handelman producing. Initially developed as a reboot of the franchise, the film is a continuation of the original TV series and the McG-directed 2000s films.

The third installment stars Kristen Stewart, Naomi Scott and Ella Balinska as the new generation of Angels. Banks and Djimon Hounsou also star as Charlie's assistants, known as Bosleys, while Patrick Stewart replaced Bill Murray in the role of John Bosley and Jaclyn Smith reprised her role as Kelly Garrett for the second time for a cameo appearance. It is also the first installment to feature Robert Clotworthy as the voice of Charlie, replacing John Forsythe, following his death in 2010.

References

External links

 
 
 

2003 films
2003 comedy films
2003 action comedy films
2000s buddy comedy films
2000s English-language films
2000s female buddy films
American action comedy films
American buddy comedy films
American female buddy films
American sequel films
Charlie's Angels (franchise)
Class reunions in popular culture
Columbia Pictures films
Films about witness protection
Films based on television series
Films directed by McG
Films produced by Drew Barrymore
Films scored by Edward Shearmur
Films set in 1995
Films set in 2003
Films set in Inner Mongolia
Films set in Los Angeles
Films shot in Los Angeles
Films with screenplays by John August
Flower Films films
Golden Raspberry Award winning films
Wonderland Sound and Vision films
2000s American films